Route 365, also known as Conne River Road, is a  north–south highway on the island of Newfoundland in the Canadian province of Newfoundland and Labrador. It serves as the only road connection to the town of Conne River and the Miawpukek First Nation, connecting them with Route 360 (Bay d'Espoir Highway). It is a two-lane highway for its entire length and parallels the Conne River, the actual river, for the majority of its length, when its not following the banks of Bay d'Espoir.

Major intersections

References

365